Homestead Technologies is a web hosting company based in Burlington, Massachusetts. Homestead offers its members WYSIWIG tools to build and publish their own websites. Since its founding in 1997 as a free service provider, Homestead has expanded the scope of its services to include online marketing, paid search ads, SEO tools and e-commerce services. Homestead.com, which launched in June 1998, enables Internet users to build a website, with focus on small businesses, e-commerce, and their related services, such as consulting, listings and online business directories.

History
Founded in October 1997 by Justin S. Kitch and Thai Bui, in Menlo Park, California, Homestead quickly became popular due to its accessibility and ease of use. Its proprietary drag-and-drop SiteBuilder platform enabled users with no prior knowledge of coding or web programming to create fully functioning websites for personal, educational or business use. Homestead is geared mostly towards small business owners, non-profit administrators, retailers, and hobbyists, unlike competitors such as Angelfire and Yahoo! GeoCities, who target more casual users. By October 1999 member registrations reached two million.

In October 2003, Homestead Technologies launched PhotoSite, a photo sharing and web hosting service tailored to amateur digital photography.  In March 2005, PhotoSite was sold to United Online.

In December 2007, Homestead was acquired by financial and tax preparation software giant Intuit for $170 million to bolster its web hosting offerings. On August 16, 2012, Intuit announced that Homestead would be purchased by web hosting company Endurance International Group of Burlington, Massachusetts.

See also
Angelfire
GeoCities
Tripod
WordPress

References 

Web hosting
Companies based in Massachusetts
Endurance International Group